Nicholas ("Nick") Jean Buckfield (born 5 June 1973) is an English former pole vaulter.

Athletics career
During his youth he was a talented footballer, turning down a youth training contract with Aldershot F.C. at the age of 16. He was educated at Brunel University London, where he studied Religious Studies and Sports Sciences. He finished fifth in the 1997 World Championships and narrowly missed out on medals at the 2002 and 2006 Commonwealth Games.  His career suffered setbacks due to a series of injuries, fracturing his pelvis whilst competing at the 1998 European Athletics Championships, suffering an abdominal injury after falling onto his pole at a meeting in Cottbus in 2004, and sustaining an Achilles tendon rupture in 2006. He retired from competition in 2008.

His personal best jump was 5.80 metres, achieved in May 1998 in Chania. This was a British national record, which he held for 14 years until Steven Lewis broke it in 2012. His indoor best was 5.81 metres, achieved in February 2002 in Bad Segeberg. This was also a British national record, and stood for 12 years until it was bettered by Luke Cutts in 2014.

Competition record

References

gbrathletics

1973 births
Living people
English male pole vaulters
British male pole vaulters
Athletes (track and field) at the 1996 Summer Olympics
Athletes (track and field) at the 2004 Summer Olympics
Olympic athletes of Great Britain
Athletes (track and field) at the 1994 Commonwealth Games
Athletes (track and field) at the 2002 Commonwealth Games
Athletes (track and field) at the 2006 Commonwealth Games
Commonwealth Games competitors for England
Alumni of Brunel University London